Anthony Tailboyes (died 1584), of Skirmington, County Durham, was an English politician.

He was a Member (MP) of the Parliament of England for Aldborough in 1563.

References

Year of birth unknown
1584 deaths
People from County Durham
English MPs 1563–1567